The 2007–08 Top League was the fifth season of Japan's domestic rugby union competition, the Top League. The Sanyo Wild Knights became the first ever team in the Top League to win all their league games, but were defeated for the Top League title by Suntory Sungoliath 14-10 in the Microsoft Cup final on February 24, 2008 at Chichibunomiya.

The Top League is a semi-professional competition which is at the top of the national league system in Japan, with promotion and relegation between the next level down.

Japan Rugby League One
1
Jap